The Open Group is a global consortium that seeks to "enable the achievement of business objectives" by developing "open, vendor-neutral technology standards and certifications." It has over 840 member organizations and provides a number of services, including strategy, management, innovation and research, standards, certification, and test development. It was established in 1996 when X/Open merged with the Open Software Foundation.

The Open Group is the certifying body for the UNIX trademark, and publishes the Single UNIX Specification technical standard, which extends the POSIX standards. The Open Group also develops and manages the TOGAF standard, which is an industry standard enterprise architecture framework.

Members
The over 840 members include a range of technology vendors and buyers as well as government agencies, including, for example, Capgemini, Fujitsu, HPE, Orbus Software, IBM, Huawei, Philips, the U.S. Department of Defense, and NASA. There is no obligation on product developers or vendors to adopt the standards developed by the association.

Platinum members:

 DXC Technology, USA
 Fujitsu, Japan
 HCL Technologies, India
 Huawei, China
 IBM, USA
 Intel, USA
 Micro Focus, UK
 Philips, Netherlands

History 
By the early 1990s, the major UNIX system vendors had begun to realize that the standards rivalries (often called the "Unix wars") were causing all participants more harm than good, leaving the UNIX industry open to emerging competition from Microsoft.  The COSE initiative in 1993 can be considered to be the first unification step, and the merger of the Open Software Foundation (OSF) and X/Open in 1996 as the ultimate step, in the end of those skirmishes. OSF had previously merged with UNIX International in 1994, meaning that the new entity effectively represented all elements of the Unix community of the time.

In January 1997, the responsibility for the X Window System was transferred to The Open Group from the defunct X Consortium. In 1999, X.Org was formed to manage the X Window System, with management services provided by The Open Group. The X.Org members made a number of releases up to and including X11R6.8 while The Open Group provided management services. In 2004, X.Org and The Open Group worked together to establish the newly formed X.Org Foundation which then took control of the x.org domain name, and the stewardship of the X Window System. (See history of the X Window System.)

Programs

Certification 
Key services of The Open Group are certification programs, including certification for products and best practices: POSIX, UNIX, and O-TTPS.

The Open Group offers certifications for technology professionals. In addition to TOGAF certification which covers tools, services and people certification, The Open Group also administers the following experience-based Professional Certifications: Certified Architect (Open CA), Certification Program Accreditation, Certified Data Scientist (Open CDS), Certified Technical Specialist (Open CTS), and Certified Trusted Technology Practitioner (Open CTTP). The Open Group also offers certification for ArchiMate tools and people, as well as people certification for Open FAIR and IT4IT, standards of The Open Group.

Member Forums and Consortia 

The Open Group provides a platform for its members to discuss their requirements, and work jointly on development and adoption of industry standards, to facilitate enterprise integration. (Note: Some of The Open Group documents are only available to members, especially when they are under development.) Based on their area of interest, members can join one or more semi-autonomous forums, which include:
 ArchiMate Forum
 Architecture Forum
 Digital Practitioner Work Group
 Exploration, Mining, Metals and Minerals Forum
 Healthcare Forum
 IT4IT Forum
 Jericho Forum - merged with Security Forum in 2014
 Open Platform 3.0 Forum - 'sunset' in 2019
Open Footprint Forum
Open Process Automation Forum (OPAF)
OSDU™ Forum
 Real Time and Embedded Systems Forum
 Security Forum
 Open Trusted Technology Forum
 Universal Data Element Framework Forum - merged with Open Platform 3.0 in 2015; now known as O-DEF (Open Data Element Framework)
Future Airborne Capability Environment (FACE)
Sensor Open Systems Architecture (SOSA)
Members come together at The Open Group quarterly, regionals, and industry events, and member meetings.

Collaboration Services 
The Open Group also provides a range of services, from initial setup and ongoing operational support to collaboration, standards and best practices development, and assistance with market impact activities. They assist organizations with setting business objectives, strategy and procurement, and also provide certification and test development. This includes services to the government agencies, suppliers, and companies or organizations set up by governments.

Inventions and standards 
 The Open Agile Architecture Standard
The ArchiMate Technical standard
The ArchiMate Exchange File Format standard
The Open Trusted Technology Provider Standard (O-TTPS) 
The Call Level Interface (the basis for ODBC)
The Common Desktop Environment (CDE)
The Digital Practitioner Body of Knowledge Standard
The Distributed Computing Environment (the basis for DCOM)
The Distributed Relational Database Architecture (DRDA) 
The Future Airborne Capability Environment (FACE) Technical standard
The Motif GUI widget toolkit (used in CDE) 
The O-PAS Technical Standard
The Open Group Service Integration Maturity Model (OSIMM)
The Open Information Security Maturity Model (O-ISM3)
The Single UNIX Specification (SUS) 
The Service-Oriented Architecture (SOA) Source Book
TOGAF (Enterprise Architecture Framework)
The Application Response Measurement (ARM) standard 
The Common Manageability Programming Interface (CMPI) standard 
The Universal Data Element Framework (UDEF) standard 
The XA Specification

See also 
 Joint Inter-Domain Management

References

External links 

 
POSIX
Standards organizations
Technology consortia
Unix
Unix standards
X Window System